Wiesław Andrzej Szczepański (born 1 June 1960 in Chrośnica) is a Polish politician. He was elected to the Sejm on 25 September 2005, getting 8253 votes in 36 Kalisz district as a candidate for the Democratic Left Alliance list.

He was also a member of Sejm 1993-1997 and Sejm 1997-2001.

See also
Members of Polish Sejm 2005-2007

External links
Wiesław Andrzej Szczepański - parliamentary page - includes declarations of interest, voting record, and transcripts of speeches.

1960 births
Living people
Democratic Left Alliance politicians
Members of the Polish Sejm 1993–1997
Members of the Polish Sejm 1997–2001
Members of the Polish Sejm 2005–2007
Members of the Polish Sejm 2007–2011
Members of the Polish Sejm 2019–2023
Chairs of voivodeship assemblies in Poland
Greater Poland Voivodeship